Ramne is a village in the municipality of Ohrid, North Macedonia.

Demographics
According to the statistics of the Bulgarian ethnographer Vasil Kanchov from 1900, 140 inhabitants lived in Ramne, all Bulgarian Exarchists. 

As of the 2021 census, Ramne had 617 residents with the following ethnic composition:
Macedonians 595
Serbs 7
Others 7
Persons for whom data are taken from administrative sources 6

According to the 2002 census, the village had a total of 632 inhabitants. Ethnic groups in the village include:
Macedonians 594
Turks 11
Serbs 6
Albanians 2
Aromanians 2
Others 17

References

Villages in Ohrid Municipality